Marc Tisseyre is a French rugby league footballer who represented France at the 1995 World Cup.

Playing career
Tisseyre played for Ariège Pamiers XIII Pyrénées and AS Carcassonne.

Between 1988 and 1995 he played in eleven test matches for France, including one at the 1995 World Cup.

References

Living people
French rugby league players
France national rugby league team players
Rugby league props
AS Carcassonne players
Year of birth missing (living people)